1934 was the 41st season of County Championship cricket in England. England lost the Ashes with Don Bradman again the crucial difference between two very strong teams, Australia winning 2–1. Lancashire won the championship.

Honours
County Championship – Lancashire
Minor Counties Championship – Lancashire II
Wisden – Stan McCabe, Bill O'Reilly, George Paine, Bill Ponsford, Jim Smith

Test series

England lost the Ashes to Australia who won the first and final Tests.  England won the second by an innings, Hedley Verity taking 15 wickets, with the other two matches drawn.

County Championship

Leading batsmen
Don Bradman topped the averages with 2020 runs @ 84.16

Leading bowlers
Bill O'Reilly topped the averages with 109 wickets @ 17.04

References

Annual reviews
 Wisden Cricketers' Almanack 1935

Further reading
 Bill Frindall, The Wisden Book of Test Cricket 1877-1978, Wisden, 1979
 Chris Harte, A History of Australian Cricket, Andre Deutsch, 1993
 Ray Robinson, On Top Down Under, Cassell, 1975

External links
 CricketArchive – season summary

1934 in English cricket
English cricket seasons in the 20th century